Brookside Farm and Mill is a historic grist mill and farm complex located at Independence, Grayson County, Virginia.  The Brookside Mill was built in 1876, and is a three-story, three bay by three bay, heavy timber frame building measuring 30 feet by 35 feet.  The principal dwelling was built in 1877, and is a two-story, three bay, frame building with a central passage plan.  Other contributing buildings and structures include a brick spring house, brick smokehouse, log corn crib, frame hen house (c. 1910-1912), miller's cabin (c. 1880), the miller's cottage or Graham House (c. 1900), a frame service station / garage (1918), and concrete dam (1914) and earthen mill race.

It was listed on the National Register of Historic Places in 2005.

References

Farms on the National Register of Historic Places in Virginia
Grinding mills on the National Register of Historic Places in Virginia
1876 establishments in Virginia
Buildings and structures in Grayson County, Virginia
National Register of Historic Places in Grayson County, Virginia
Industrial buildings completed in 1876
Grinding mills in Virginia
U.S. Route 58